Galaxy Force may refer to:

Galaxy Force (video game), a 3D shooter video game by Sega, also released by Activision for many home computers
Transformers: Galaxy Force, the 16th Transformers animated series (Transformers: Cybertron in United States)
Power Rangers: Galaxy Force, an animated Super Sentai and Power Rangers television series